Brownsville is an unincorporated community in Kent County, Delaware, United States. Brownsville is located at the intersection of Brownsville Road and Drapers Corners Road, west of Harrington.

History
Brownsville's population was 25 in 1890, and was 20 in 1900.

References

Unincorporated communities in Kent County, Delaware
Unincorporated communities in Delaware